The Trium Group (Trium) is a San Francisco, California-based management consulting firm. They specialize in corporate transformation, culture change, restructuring and leadership-driven change management.

History
Trium was founded in 1998 by Andrew Blum, Jib Ellison, Tom Miller and Jon Rich. Blum runs the firm as CEO and Managing Partner.  A former Marine, Blum worked at consulting firm Towers Perrin prior to founding Trium.

In 2006 The Wall Street Journal profiled Trium and noted they let dissatisfied clients pay as little as half of their contracted services fees and asking delighted clients to pay up to 35% more than their contracted fees.

Recognition
The Trium Group, a global management firm specialized in innovative market results, has been given a recognition as The 2019 Top Ten Company For Leadership Development Services by HR Tech Outlook. Trium also had an influence on some of the most successful businesses around the country, including Dropbox, Genentech, Cisco, Sony Pictures, Warner Bros., eBay, Sephora, lululemon, StubHub, Activision Blizzard, Disney, and more.

References

External links 
 

Consulting firms established in 1998
Management consulting firms of the United States
Companies based in San Francisco